Hailun is a city in west-central Heilongjiang province, People's Republic of China. Administratively, it is a county-level city under Suihua City.

History

Before the Qing Dynasty
Hailun was one of the earliest centrally governed counties in Heilongjiang Province. The city was named after the Hailun River, which runs through it. The name Hailun is a variation of a Manchu word that sounds like "kailing", which means "otter". This name was chosen due to the abundance of otters inhabiting the nearby river. The area around Hailun was initially ruled by the Manchu people and was administrated from Hulan City for much of the Manchu Qing Dynasty.

Qing Dynasty
By 1885 (the eleventh ruling year of the Emperor Guangxu of the Qing Dynasty), Hailun was administrated by the prefecture-level city of Suihua. In 1898, the Tongken Deputy Metropolitan Government was established, and the territory of Hailun County was placed under its jurisdiction. The Tongken Deputy Metropolitan Government was dissolved in 1906.

Republic of China
In 1912, Republic of China's first year in power, Hailun Prefecture was renamed to Hailun County. In 1932, following the Japanese annexation of Manchuria, Hailun County was absorbed into the Japanese puppet state of Manchukuo. On August 15, 1945, Manchukuo was liberated by the Soviet Red Army, and the puppet state was disestablished. The region was then handed over to the People’s Liberation Army under Mao Zedong.
Under the leadership of the Chinese Communist Party, the People's Government was established in Manchuria in November 1945. Hailun County was under the direct jurisdiction of the CCP and the PLA until the founding of the People's Republic of China in 1949.

People's Republic of China
Since the founding of the People's Republic of China in 1949, Hailun County has been under the jurisdiction of Heilongjiang Province. On December 23, 1989, the State Council approved the renaming of Hailun County to Hailun City (county level).The name change did not affect the administrative jurisdiction under the city, and it was still governed through the Suihua District. On January 11, 1990, the area was officially renamed.

Geography and climate

Hailun is located on the Songnen Plain with the Lesser Khingan mountain range to the west. Its administrative area ranges in latitude from 46° 58' to 47° 52' N, and in longitude from 126° 14' to 127° 45' E.

Hailun has a humid continental climate (Köppen: Dwb), with long, cold, and dry winters and humid, warm summers. Nearly two-thirds of the annual precipitation falls between June to August. With percent possible sunshine ranging from 53% in July to 71% in February, the city receives 2,680 hours of sunshine annually.

Administrative divisions 
Hailun City is divided into 14 towns and 9 townships. 
14 towns
 Hailun, Haibei, Lunhe, Gonghe, Haixing, Xiangfu, Dongfeng, Baixiang, Xiangrong, Yongfu, Zhangfa, Lianfa, Qianjin, Gongrong
9 townships
 Donglin, Hainan, Leye, Fumin, Fengshan, Yonghe, Aimin, Zhayinhe, Shuanglu

References

External links
Official website of Hailun government 
 http://www.babynamespedia.com/meaning/Hailun

 
Cities in Heilongjiang
County level divisions of Heilongjiang
Suihua